Harald Ekwall (14 December 1873 – 1935) was a Chilean sports shooter. He competed in four events at the 1912 Summer Olympics.

References

1873 births
1935 deaths
Chilean male sport shooters
Olympic shooters of Chile
Shooters at the 1912 Summer Olympics
Sportspeople from Leipzig
German emigrants to Chile
20th-century Chilean people